Edward Wigglesworth may refer to:

 Edward Michael Wigglesworth (c. 1693–1765), clergyman and teacher in colonial America
 Edward Wigglesworth (1732–1794), professor of divinity at Harvard College
 Edward Samuel Wigglesworth (1741–1826), commander of the 13th Massachusetts Regiment, also known as Wigglesworth's State Regiment, and 6th Continental Regiment, during the American Revolutionary War

See also
 Wigglesworth (disambiguation)